Brookfield Community School is a large state-funded secondary school located in the Locks Heath ward of the Borough of Fareham. Brookfield serves 5 feeder schools in the local area. Brookfield is one of the largest co-educational, comprehensive secondary schools in Hampshire; the school currently has approximately 1800 students on-roll and there are approximately 120 teachers employed at the school. The school teaches years 7 to 11.

Status 
Specialist Status as Language College was awarded to the school in 2002. In 2010, all specialist status school funding was withdrawn by the government. Brookfield School is now solely a secondary school and not a language college.

In May 2005 the OFSTED Inspection report described the school as "good with some outstanding features".

In 2008 Brookfield was inspected by OFSTED and received a grade 3 (Satisfactory).

The school was again inspected by OFSTED in October 2010, with the outcome being an improved grade of 2 ('Good').

In January 2016, OFSTED, after a short inspection, reported that the school continues to be Good.

Subjects taught include English, Maths, Science, Geography, History, RE, Drama, Art, Dance, PE, Technology and ICT.

School buildings
There are 12 computer suites around the School, and specialist rooms for catering, science and wood tech. The performing arts centre, completed in 2003, was named after former head teacher Mark Roe.

References

External links
Official site

Secondary schools in Hampshire
Community schools in Hampshire